Bob Lodge (October 6,1940 – December 21, 2008) lived in Washington state, US. He created many puzzles and contests for Games magazine.  Lodge often placed many layers of red herrings within his creations for puzzlers to decipher.  Over the years, he made several acrostic puzzles and other challenges, including elements from U.S. geography, presidential history, stamp collecting, and mathematical brain teasers.  One of his most ambitious contests included the number-based scavenger hunt Ultimate Calculatrivia in late 2003.  He died of cancer on December 21, 2008.

Puzzle designers
1940 births
2008 deaths